Statistics of DPR Korea Football League in the 2013 season.

Overview
The Highest Class Football League was played as a single round robin in October, with ten teams taking part. April 25 won the championship, finishing with 18 points (5 wins, 3 draws, 1 loss) in the nine matches played; Man'gyŏnbong were runners-up, and Hwaebul – a new addition to the competition established in May 2013 – finished in third place.

Table

Clubs

 Although all clubs have a home stadium, all matches of the Highest Class Football League tournament were played at Kim Il-sung Stadium in P'yŏngyang.

Results

Round 1

Round 2

Round 3

Round 4

Round 5

Round 6

Round 7

Round 8

Round 9

Cup competitions

Hwaebul Cup
The Hwaebul Cup competition was held for the first time in 2013, with all matches played at Kim Il-sung Stadium in P'yŏngyang. The first stage was made up of two groups, with the first and second place finishers qualifying for the semi-finals. The semi-finals were held on (probably) 26 August, with Sŏnbong defeating Hwaebul, and April 25 defeating Amrokkang 3–1 on penalties, after regular time ended 2–2. The final was played on 28 August, between Sŏnbong and April 25. Regular play ended with the sides level at 2–2, and Sŏnbong won 6–5 on penalties. However, after the match, Sŏnbong was deemed to have fielded an ineligible player, and April 25 was awarded the victory.

Man'gyŏngdae Prize
The 2013 edition of the Man'gyŏngdae Prize was held in P'yŏngyang, with matches played at the Kim Il-sung Stadium and the Sosan Football Stadium from early March. Fourteen teams entered, including Kigwanch'a, Kyŏnggong'ŏp, Maebong, Rimyŏngsu, Sobaeksu, Myohyangsan, Man'gyŏnbong, P'yŏngyang City, and Amrokkang. The final, held on 29 April, saw Rimyŏngsu defeat Amrokkang by a score of 2–1. Having won the Man'gyŏngdae Prize, Rimyŏngsu were invited to take part in the 2014 AFC President's Cup – the first time a North Korean side would take part in an Asian club competition since April 25's last appearance in the 1991 Asian Club Championship.

Poch'ŏnbo Torch Prize
The fourth edition of the Poch'ŏnbo Torch Prize was played in two stages between 20 May and 10 July, the first being a double round-robin league phase, followed by a North American-style knock-out play-off phase. The top four finishers in the league phase qualified for the semi-finals. The final was played on 10 July, in which Hwaebul defeated Kyŏnggong'ŏp 2–1.

60th Anniversary of the Victory in the Fatherland Liberation War
A one-off competition was held for the 60th anniversary of the end of the Korean War, which is referred to as the "Fatherland Liberation War" in North Korea. April 25, Hwaebul, Rimyŏngsu, and Amrokkang took part in the competition, which was won by Amrokkang.

References

DPR Korea Football League seasons
1
Korea
Korea